Simon Kitson (born  1967) is a British historian.

Kitson did his undergraduate studies at the University of Ulster and his post-graduate studies at the University of Sussex, under the supervision of Roderick Kedward. His doctoral thesis on the Marseille Police, was examined by Mark Mazower and Clive Emsley.

He lectured in French Studies at the University of Birmingham before becoming director of research at the University of London Institute in Paris (ULIP). Dr Kitson left ULIP in April 2011 and became a senior research fellow at the Institute of Historical Research. Kitson is currently an Associate Professor of French Studies at the University of Auckland, New Zealand. He is a Fellow of the Royal Historical Society and a fellow of the Alexander von Humboldt Foundation. He is also known for the web resource on Vichy France that he set up  and for being the founder of the Facebook group 'Simon Kitson's France: News and Discussion'. He is British Correspondent of the French history journal Vingtième Siècle. and is on the editorial board of the Journal of War and Culture Studies.

Kitson has worked extensively on the French police and counter-espionage services. He is also a specialist on Vichy France, on which he published Vichy et la Chasse aux Espions Nazis with Autrement of Paris in 2005, The Hunt for Nazi Spies with the University of Chicago Press in 2008. and Police and Politics in Marseille, 1936–1945 with Brill of Amsterdam in 2014.

Publications
Books
Police and Politics in Marseille, 1936–1945, Amsterdam, Brill, 2014
 The Hunt for Nazi Spies, Chicago, University of Chicago Press, 2008
 Vichy et la chasse aux espions nazis, Paris, Autrement, 2005
 (with Hanna Diamond) Vichy, Resistance, Liberation (essays in honour of Rod Kedward), Oxford, Berg, 2005
 'The Marseille Police in their context from Popular Front to Liberation', D Phil thesis, University of Sussex, 1995

References

Sources

Simon Kitson, ULIP
Queen Mary Experts' Guide

External links
Kitson's Vichy Web
Review: Vichy et la chasse aux espions nazis, 1940–1942: complexités de la politique de collaboration
The Hunt for Nazi Spies | Simon Kitson, translated by Catherine Tihanyi | Review by The Spectator
Spy Vs. Spy – January 2, 2008 – The New York Sun

1960s births
Living people
Historians of World War II
English historians
Historians of Nazism
Social historians
Historians of France
Historians of Europe
International relations scholars
British military writers
Historians of the Holocaust
British military historians
Fellows of the Royal Historical Society
Historians of Vichy France
Academic staff of the University of Auckland
People educated at King Edward's School, Bath
British male writers
Alumni of Ulster University
Male non-fiction writers